Kevin Brandstätter (born 8 January 1996 as Kevin Metze) is an Austrian football player. He plays for SK Vorwärts Steyr.

Club career
He made his Austrian Football First League debut for FC Blau-Weiß Linz on 14 March 2017 in a game against Floridsdorfer AC.

References

External links
 

1996 births
People from Schwanenstadt
Living people
Austrian footballers
LASK players
SV Ried players
FC Blau-Weiß Linz players
SK Vorwärts Steyr players
2. Liga (Austria) players
Austrian Regionalliga players
Association football midfielders
Footballers from Upper Austria